Abel Gardey (21 November 1882, Margouët-Meymes, Gers – 23 September 1957, Pouylebon) was a French politician. He served as the Minister of Agriculture in the third Herriot government. In 1933, he was the French Minister of Budget. He later became the general reporter for the Senate finance commission and was described as a "bastion of orthodox economics" in May 1939.

References 

1882 births
1957 deaths
People from Gers
Politicians of the French Third Republic
French Ministers of Budget
French Ministers of Agriculture
Senators of Gers